The Kosovo national football team played its first official international match on 5 March 2014, drawing 0–0 to Haiti in Mitrovica. In total, 91 players have represented the Kosovo national team. This list covers players with between 1 and 9 caps for the national team organised by the Football Federation of Kosovo. The players are initially ordered by number of caps. All statistics are correct up to and including the match played on 31 March 2021 against Spain.

Players
Players in bold are called up to the squad in last 12 months and are still active at international level.
Players with flags in front of their name are players who represented Kosovo, but now represent another national team.
Players in mean line are not available at international level due to FIFA eligibility rules.

References

External links

 
Kosovo at National-Football-Teams.com
Kosovo at RSSSF

1-9 caps
Association football player non-biographical articles